Raghuveer Narayan (31 October 1884 – 1 January 1955) or Raghubir Narayan was a Bhojpuri and English poet and a freedom fighter. His Bhojpuri poem  Batohiya gained popularity equivalent to Vande Mataram and is considered as National Song of Indian in Bhojpuri language.

Life 
He was born on 31 October 1884 in Nayaganv village of Saran district of Bihar. He completed his schooling in Chhapra and higher education from Patna College. In his college days he got appreciations for his English poems by the British professors. He wrote most of his poems while he was at Patna College between 1902-1905. After completing his Bachelor of Arts he became the private secretary of King Krityanand Singh of  Banaili Estate in Purnia district of Bihar. In 1952-53 Bihar government awarded him with Sahityasevi puraskar.

Works

Bhojpuri 
 Batohiya (poem)
 Bharat Bhawani (poem)
 Raghuveer Rasa Ranga
 Raghuveer Putra Pushpa
 Nikunj Kala
 Raghuvee Ras Ganga

English

 A Tale of Bihar

References

1884 births
1955 deaths
Indian poets